Acrossocheilus paradoxus is a species of ray-finned fish in the genus Acrossocheilus from Taiwan and China. It is used for food and kept as an ornamental fish.

References

Paradoxus
Freshwater fish of China
Freshwater fish of Taiwan
Fish described in 1868
Taxa named by Albert Günther